Horace S. Manges (1898 – February 11, 1986) was an American lawyer, specializing in copyright law. He was a founding partner of Weil, Gotshal & Manges in 1931.

A native of New York City, Manges graduated from Columbia College and Columbia Law School. He became an authority on copyright law and served as a counsel to the American Book Publishers Council from 1953 to 1970. He advised publishers like Charles Scribner IV, and also represented many authors, including William Faulkner, John O'Hara, Truman Capote, Whittaker Chambers, and James Jones.

Manges was married to former Nathalie Bloch ( 1983). The couple had two sons, Gerard H. Manges ( 1983), and James H. Manges.

References 

1898 births
1986 deaths
Lawyers from New York City
20th-century American lawyers
Columbia Law School alumni
Columbia College (New York) alumni